The Université du Québec à Trois-Rivières (UQTR) (English: University of Quebec in Trois-Rivières), also known as "l'université du peuple", established in 1969 and mainly located in Trois-Rivières, Quebec, Canada, is a public university within the Université du Québec network. As of April 2016, the university had 14,500 students in 9 different campuses, including the main one in Trois-Rivières. About 788 of them come from overseas, from 50 countries. The university has given more than 88,000 diplomas since its founding. The Trois-Rivières campus also holds a large library with about 400,000 documents.

History
UQTR was created in 1969 with the merger of the "Centre d'Études universitaires de Trois-Rivières" and "L'école normale d'État Maurice Duplessis" (named after Maurice Duplessis). The first major campus, Ringuet, was opened in 1973 and is located in the vicinity of Des Forges and Des Récollets boulevards near downtown Trois-Rivières. Over the following years, UQTR has expanded outside of the city into several towns in the Centre-du-Québec, Montérégie, Lanaudière, Quebec and Chaudière-Appalaches regions.
Over the 1973-2009 time period the university has enjoyed a period of long term growth punctuated by several periods of short term fluctuation.

2005 student protests
During the 2005 student protests, students narrowly voted in early March for a three-day student strike whose period included March 16, when several hundred UQTR students participated in a general protest in Montreal. Two days later, the students narrowly voted for a return to class. However, due to complaints made by some student groups, the students and some instructors boycotted again about a week later. During the first boycott, some instructors reported to work to teach classes as scheduled. Groups called "commandos" patrolled the Trois-Rivières area in search of these instructors who failed to honour the pickets, enticing them to stay away from UQTR during the boycott.

Programs

Medicine
Since 2004, the University of Montreal Faculty of Medicine has operated a satellite campus of its medical school at UQTR. The preclinical years are simulcast with the respective classes in Montreal, and the two clinical years are completed in the Centre hospitalier régional de Trois-Rivières (CHRTR) and the Centre hospitalier du centre de la Mauricie (CHCM). The degree is granted by the University of Montreal.

In 2007, the construction of a new medical education pavilion began, which was completed in 2010.

Podiatry
In fall of 2004, UQTR launched the first podiatry program in Canada. Upon obtaining all 195 university credits, students are awarded with a Doctor of Podiatric Medicine degree; thus, this makes UQTR the first French-language university in the world to offer the DPM degree. The foundation of this program was based on the American definition of podiatric medicine and was developed in association with the New York College of Podiatric Medicine. The program enrolls 25 students per year.

Chiropractic

UQTR is home to the first public and the first university-based chiropractic school in North America. The program is limited to 47 admissions per year.

Athletic therapy
UQTR is home to the first French-speaking graduate athletic therapy program in North America. This applied Master program is limited to 25 admissions per year. The program is accredited by the Canadian Athletic Therapists Association since 2017.

Midwifery
UQTR is the only university in Quebec offering a midwifery program. It welcomes up to 24 students per year since its implementation in 1999.

Engineering
Students can choose to specialize in the following disciplines: chemical engineering, electrical engineering, industrial engineering, and mechanical engineering.

Hydrogen
UQTR hosts the Institute for Hydrogen Research (IHR), established in 1994. The mission of IHR is to advance energy transition through innovation in advanced materials, engineering, and safety. The vision of the IHR is fundamentally multidisciplinary: the research areas encompasses basic Sciences, Engineering, and Social Sciences. The object is to promote the energy transition and train a skilled and versatile workforce capable of innovating in Energy and Materials.

Sports
The university is represented in Canadian Interuniversity Sport by the UQTR Patriotes which has teams in swimming, golf, hockey, soccer, cheerleading, badminton, athleticism and volleyball.

Notable people

Faculty
 Georges Larivière
 Bruno Georges Pollet

Alumni

 Robert Aubin
 Pierre-Michel Auger
 Xavier Barsalou-Duval
 Lysane Blanchette-Lamothe
 Gilles Bouchard
 Marc-Yvan Côté
 Jean Damphousse
 Angèle Delaunois
 Sam Hamad
 Donald Martel
 Michel Matte
 Macsuzy Mondon
 Roger Paquin
 Jean-Guy Paré
 Fred Pellerin
 Pierre Pettigrew
 Louis Plamondon
 Hery Rajaonarimampianina
 Jean Rioux
 Michel Seymour
 Judy Streatch
 Luc Tardif
 Rémy Trudel

Further reading
Ferretti, Lucia. L'Université en réseau: les 25 ans de l'Université du Québec. Sainte-Foy: Presses de l'Université du Québec, 1994.

See also
 Canadian government scientific research organizations
 Canadian industrial research and development organizations
 Canadian Interuniversity Sport
 Canadian university scientific research organizations
 CFOU Radio
 Higher education in Quebec
 List of universities in Quebec

References

External links
Université du Québec à Trois-Rivières

Educational institutions established in 1969
Trois Rivieres
Education in Trois-Rivières
1969 establishments in Quebec
Universities in Quebec